Fudbalski klub Čukarički is a Serbian professional football club from Belgrade, more precisely from the Čukarica municipality, that currently plays in the Serbian SuperLiga, the top tier of Serbian football.

Founded in 1926, the club spent the first years of its existence in the amateur field. In the days of Yugoslavia, Čukarički played predominantly in the lower divisions of the country. The first notable achievements for the club were in the seasons of 1971–72 and 1993–94, when they reached the Yugoslav Second League respectively and then reaching for the first time ever in the club's history the national top tier of football the Yugoslav First League the first tier in the newly created Serbia/Montenegro, as well as for the first time in the club's history playing on the European stage in the UEFA Intertoto Cup 1996 and the UEFA Intertoto Cup 1997.

On 17 April 2012, the club was bought by Dragan Obradović, the owner of the Serbian construction and wholesale company ADOC. Since then Čukarički is the first ever professional football club in Serbia to have been privatized, and is also one of the first clubs in Southeast Europe which were ever bought. Since being bought the club has become one of the most stable and organised clubs in Serbian football and has competed in the Europa League on four occassions since 2014 

The club won the 2014–15 Serbian Cup, their highest league finishes have been third place two times in 2014–15, 2015–16 seasons.

The most famous players to represent the club include: Aleksandar Kolarov who would go on to become one of the world's best left backs of his generation and represent the national team of Serbia at two world cups, Milos Ninkovic, Milan Dudic, Goran Gavrancic, Albert Nadj, amongst many others.

History

Beginnings of Čukarički (1926–1942)
The club had emerged from Čukarica, more precisely in the working-class neighborhood of the Belgrade municipality, which is located on the right bank of the Sava River. The club was formed on 4 July 1926 during a meeting that took place in a restaurant named Majdan, where the club got its official name, ČSK–Čukarički sport klub, and the decision was made that the club colors should be black and white, a tradition which is still present. The first president was Miloš Ilić, known as the first Serbian aviator respectively combat pilots of the 1st class, and by that time a reservist of the Royal Yugoslav Air Force. The first players of the club were amateurs, which organized the pitch, made their own jerseys and nets.

ČSK started in the third league of the Belgrade League system, but in 1928 managed to promoted to the second Belgrade League, where the club was able to keep several seasons. In the season 1931–32, ČSK became champion and thus played from the next season in the Belgrad B-League, which they gained finally in 1935. So, the club celebrated its first decade of existence with championship success. During this first period of success, especially striker Aleksandar Petrović, called Pikavac, was one of the most important figures of the club. Coming from Palilulac Belgrade in 1932, he played in ČSK until 1936, when he was transferred to SK Jugoslavija, one of the major national clubs. As a member of the Yugoslav national team, he is remembered as one of the best dribblers of Kingdom of Yugoslavia.

In 1936, ČSK entered to the Belgrade First A-League, which was one of the Yugoslav Second League's at that time, but relegated after two years. The generational change in the squad is considered to be the reason for such a bad season, but after only one year, the club was back and won immediately the championship. However, in that season the club was merged with FK Istra, a move that was not supported by many members of the direction board, and much less among the players. Because of this, local popularity fell and the vast majority of the players moved to neighbouring clubs Banovac, Makiš and Šećeranac. This made a stagnation in the club and during the following seasons the club did not compete in any level until 1942.

The club during the World War II (1942–1944)
During World War II, the Kingdom of Yugoslavia was invaded in April 1941 by the Axis powers and divided. Parts of Serbia fell to the Independent State of Croatia, the Kingdom of Hungary, or were under Nazi-Germany administration, among Belgrade, which was occupied by the Wehrmacht. Under difficult circumstances, it was permitted for certain clubs to play football, including ČSK. Already after the invasion, the club returned 1942 after six years of abstinence successfully in the competition and won the First Belgrade League, thus played next season in the Serbian League, the top national tier during the war. In the 1942–43 season the club finished 4th, a remarkable achievement because they finished in front of several favourites like Jedinstvo Belgrade or BASK.

In that period there was a popular domestic tournament named Letnji Pehar (Summer Trophy), where the best clubs competed like BSK, SK 1903, Obilić Belgrade and so also ČSK. Finally, the club defeated SK Banovac in the quarter-finals (2–1, 0–1), but lost against SK 1903 in the semi-finals (0–2, 0–2). The 1943–44 Belgrade First League season was formed by 10 clubs however after 8 rounds it was interrupted with ČSK placed as 6th. By the end of the war the club did not play under its name, only restoring its name in 1948 as FK Čukarički, now part of the Čukarički Sports Association.

From the subclass to the first league (1944–2003)

In 1948, playing in the Belgrade Second League, which was the 6th tier of the newly formed league system of the Socialist Yugoslavia, the club finished 4th. It was coached by Jovan Veselinović and the squad was formed mostly by experienced older players. In 1950–51 with an already renovated squad, it finishes third and qualified to the Belgrade First League where it also finished third achieving promotion to the 1953–54 Belgrade Podsavezna League, the national fourth tier, where they finished third, again. Led by the coach Žikica Spasojević and striker Petar Popović they achieved the promotion to the 1954–55 Serbian League, the third tier.

In summer 1955, Vule Radosavljević was made the main coach, however the club ended the first half of the season at bottom. Radosavljević was replaced by Dragomir Kojadinović and there were also changes at club direction board which may have contributed to a comeback with the team finishing the season in 8th place. This earned them participation in the pley-off for the Yugoslav Second League, however they failed to qualify. In 1955–56, many players left the club, and led by coach Brana Aćimović they finished 2nd in the Belgrade Podsavezna League. 1956 is the year of the beginning of the fall as many important club players retired in that period.

Also, numerous club directions and coaches succeeded. So, the club played constantly in Belgrade leagues. Great achievement was brought on to the club ten years later in the 1966–67 season when they finished first in the Second Belgrade League and won the Belgrade Cup the same year. They were promoted to the Serbian League where they were constantly on top. So, these seasons, the club competed for promotion to the Yugoslav Second league, which he reached as a champion of the 1971–72 season. There, Čukarički held for several years, but did not succeed to promotion to the Yugoslav First League.

In the early 1990s, the club played again in the third tier and between 1993 and 1995 in the second league of the Federal Republic of Yugoslavia. In the 1994–95 season, the club managed finally for the first time in its history the promotion to the first league, where they played until 1998. In the Yugoslav Cup in 1995, Čukarički came into the quarterfinals and also competed in the UEFA Intertoto Cup in 1996 and 1997. Their biggest success during this period came in the 1999–00 season, when they finished 6th in the first league, in which 21 teams participated. The club remained till 2003 in the first division.

From insolvency to privatization (2003–present)

After four years in the first league, Čukarički was relegated in 2003. Although they succeeded in 2004 as champion of the group West in ensuring the direct re-promotion, the club was relegated again in 2005. Čukarički was renamed in the early 2000s, as the Serbian company Stankom dedicated itself as the main sponsor and funder. Therefore, the club was known for a long time under the name Čukarički Stankom. By the arrival of Stankom the club was stabilized. So, they improved the organization, increased the stadium capacity to 7,000 and also brought a better financial situation. In 2007, Čukarički finally reached the top division, the Serbian SuperLiga.

From August 2007 to December 2008, the former Bundesliga manager Dragoslav Stepanović coached the club. After seven defeats in a row and the time between last place in the 2008–09 season, he was relieved of his duties. At the end of the season, the team made the 9th place in the table under coach Dejan Đurđević and remained in the league.

The 2009–10 season ended for Čukarički with the 13th place and they barely escaped relegation, three points ahead of Napredak Kruševac. This luck the team could not maintain in the 2010–11 season. The club could not win a single one of its thirty league matches and finished with just five points on the last place and was relegated to the Serbian First League.

Also in the Second League, Čukarički was not very successful. With 41 points they were equal on points with Banat Zrenjanin and Radnički Sombor. Because of the direct comparison between all three teams only Radnički Sombor had to join the 3rd league as 15th of the final table. The club was in a very difficult financial situation and was on the verge of bankruptcy, however, the year 2011 marked a turning point, as the construction and wholesale company ADOC, which operates in the pharmacy, diagnostics and construction industry, bought up Čukarički and immediately invested in the club, making Čukarički the first professional football club in Serbia which was privatized, and also one of the few clubs in Southeast Europe which are privately owned.

Through the privatization, the financial and organizational situation of the club improved significantly, but also in the infrastructure and the squad investments were made. In the 2012–13 season, the club then managed to finish as runner-up of the second league and returned to the first league. In the following 2013–14 season, the upswing of the club continued, so Čukarički was able to secure a surprising 5th place in the league.

European record

Matches

Notes
 1QR: First qualifying round
 2QR: Second qualifying round
 3QR: Third qualifying round

Stadium
Čukarički Stadium, also known as Stadion na Banovom brdu, was inaugurated in 1969 and has an all-seated capacity of 4,070.

The supporters are known as Brđani, a colloquial name attributed to people from Belgrade residential area known as Banovo Brdo where the club offices and the stadium are located.  The group was formed in 1991.

Honours
 Serbian SuperLiga
 Third place (4): 2014–15, 2015–16, 2020–21, 2021–22
 Serbian Cup
 Winners: 2014–15

Current squad

First team

Players with multiple nationalities 
   Stefan Kovač

Out on loan

Technical staff
Updated 19 July 2022

Club management
Updated 19 July 2022

Notable players
This is a list of FK Čukarički players with senior national team appearances:

 Serbia and its predecessors
Miroslav Bogosavac
Veljko Birmančević
Milko Djurovski
Milan Dudić
Goran Gavrančić
Franjo Giler
Jovan Gojković
Bojan Isailović
Aleksandar Jevtić
Đorđe Jovanović
Aleksandar Jović
Aleksandar Kolarov
Blagoje Marjanović
Srđan Mijailović
Albert Nađ
Pavle Ninkov
Miloš Ninković
Ajazdin Nuhi
Andrija Pavlović
Aleksandar Petrović
Nikola Trajković
Milan Vilotić
Milivoje Vitakić
Other
 Admir Aganović
 Srđan Pecelj
 Nemanja Supić
 Lucas Piasentin
 Dilan Ortiz
 Lee Addy
 Obeng Regan
 Samuel Owusu
 Mink Peeters
 Mario Gjurovski
 Perica Stančeski
 Ostoja Stjepanović
 Darko Bulatović
 Đorđije Ćetković
 Nikola Drinčić
 Branislav Janković
 Asmir Kajević
 Ivan Kecojević
 Boris Kopitović
 Dušan Lagator
 Risto Lakić
 Staniša Mandić
 Mitar Novaković
 Marko Rakonjac
 Filip Stojković
 Darko Zorić
 Rudolf Bester
 Eliphas Shivute
 Eze Vincent Okeuhie
 Ugo Ukah
 Ibrahima Ndiaye
 Kelfala Marah
 Eugene Sseppuya

For the list of current and former FK Čukarički players with Wikipedia article, see :Category:FK Čukarički players.

Former managers
  Karlo Dobrijević
  Franjo Giler
  Dragan Okuka (1 July 1996 – 30 June 1997)
  Goran Stevanović (1 July 2001–01)
  Željko Simović (2003)
  Nikola Rakojević (2004–2005)
  Borislav Raduka
  Dragoslav Stepanović (24 Aug 2007 – 8 Dec 2008)
  Srđan Golović (interim) (8 Dec 2008 – 26 Dec 2008)
  Dejan Đurđević (26 Dec 2008 – 30 June 2009)
  Miloljub Ostojić (1 July 2009 – 22 Aug 2009)
  Srđan Vasiljević (22 Aug 2009 – 30 Jan 2010)
  Simo Krunić (1 Feb 2010 – 12 Aug 2010)
  Aleksandar Jović (12 Aug 2010 – 9 Nov 2010)
  Dragan Lacmanović (12 Jan 2011 – 30 June 2011)
  Vladimir Romčević (1 July 2011 – 1 February 2012)
  Vladan Milojević (1 February 2012 – 2 Oct 2015)
  Zoran Popović (6 Oct 2015 – 7 Mar 2016)
  Milan Lešnjak (7 Mar 2016 – 12 Sep 2016)
  Gordan Petrić (22 Sep 2016 – 17 Dec 2016)
  Nenad Lalatović (26 Dec 2016 – 14 May 2018)
  Nenad Mirosavljević (15 May 2018 – 30 Jun 2018)
  Simo Krunić (1 Jul 2018 – 25 May 2019)
  Aleksandar Veselinović (25 May 2019 – 20 Sep 2020)
   Dušan Đorđević (20 Sep 2020 – 16 Aug 2021)
   Saša Ilić (17 Aug 2021 – 11 Apr 2022)
  Milan Lešnjak (12 Apr 2022 –26 May 2022)

Kit manufacturers and shirt sponsors

References

External links

 

 
Football clubs in Serbia
Football clubs in Yugoslavia
Association football clubs established in 1926
1926 establishments in Serbia
Football clubs in Belgrade
Čukarica